"Revolution (In the Summertime?)" is a song by the Scottish rock band Cosmic Rough Riders. Released in 2001, it was one of two Top 40 hits for the band that year, along with "The Pain Inside".

Track listing
 "Revolution (In the Summertime?)"
 "Move Along"
 "The Gun Isn't Loaded" (live)
Poptones MC5047SCD

References

Songs about revolutions
2001 singles
2000 songs